The following are lists of writers:

Alphabetical indices
A – B – C – D –
E – F –
G – H –
I – J –
K – L –
M – N –
O – P –
Q – R –
S – T –
U – V –
W – X –
Y – Z

Lists by genre

Top of page

Lists by language (non-English)

Top of page

Lists by ethnicity or nationality

Top of page

Lists of women writers and works 

Main list
 Women writers: (A-L), (M-Z)
By country

Other lists of women writers

Top of page

Lists by publisher
 List of Alfred A. Knopf authors
 List of Minerva Press authors

Top of page

See also
 Lists of books
 List of literary awards

External links
 
 
 "Poets & Writers Directory." Poets & Writers
 "Authors A-Z." The Guardian
 "Browse By Author." Project Gutenberg

Top of page

 

el:Κατάλογος συγγραφέων
ja:作家一覧